Magenta is a town and comune in the Metropolitan City of Milan in Lombardy, northern Italy. It became notable as the site of the Battle of Magenta in 1859.  The color magenta takes its name from the battle, most likely referring to the uniforms used by Zouave French troops. 

Magenta is the birthplace of Saint Gianna Beretta Molla (1922–1962) and film producer Carlo Ponti (1912–2007).

History 

Magenta was probably a settlement of the Insubres, a Celtic tribe, who founded it around the 5th century BC. The area was conquered by the Romans in 222 BC. The name is traditionally connected to castrum Maxentiae, meaning "castle of Maxentius". After the fall of the Western Roman Empire, it was ruled by the Lombards. The Celtic origins of Magenta are proved by some important archeological finds, especially in the area where now  the Institute of Canossian Mothers stands; there was a Celtic necropolis in ancient times. Objects, jewelry and weapons were found here.

In the Middle Ages, it was destroyed twice, in 1162 by Frederick Barbarossa and in 1356 by the troops opposing the Visconti rule of Milan. In 1310, according to a legend, the emperor Henry VII was stopped here by a snowstorm during his march to Milan. In 1398 Gian Galeazzo Visconti donated the town territories to the monks of the Certosa di Pavia.

On June 4, 1859, it was the site of an important battle of the Second War of Italian Independence. The Franco-Piedmontese victory in the fight gave them the chance to conquer Austrian Lombardy.

Magenta received the honorary title of city with a presidential decree on May 25, 1947.

Main sights 
 Church of San Martino, built to commemorate the dead of the 1859 battle
 Monastery of Santa Maria Assunta, probably dating from the 14th century. The church, of Romanesque origin but with Baroque interiors, houses two works by il Bergognone (1501, once attributed to Bernardino Luini's workshop).
 Church of San Rocco (early 16th century)
 Casa Crivelli Boisio Beretta, an example of 15th-century noble house
 Casa Giacobbe
 Monument to general Patrice de MacMahon
 La Fagiana natural park, a former hunting resort of King Victor Emmanuel II

Transport

Twin towns 
Magenta is twinned with:

  Magenta, (Marne), France
  Sant'Anna di Stazzema, Italy

Gallery

Notes